Senator Looney may refer to:

Lamar Looney (1871–1935), Oklahoma State Senate
Martin Looney (born 1948), Connecticut State Senate